The Rodda Paint Company was founded in 1932 by Arthur Rodda along with his first employee Thomas 'Morey' Braden in Portland, Oregon. Rodda is the largest family-owned, regional paint company in the Pacific Northwest. Based in Portland, the company owns and operates 60 commercial and retail stores throughout Oregon, Washington, Alaska, Idaho, and Montana.

History
In August 2004, Rodda Paint Co. was acquired by with Cloverdale Paint, Inc., in Surrey, British Columbia. At the time, Rodda had 41 retail stores. Rodda signed a deal with Devine Color in May 2013 in which Rodda would distribute Devine's zero-VOC paint line. The merged operation operates under the Rodda name in the United States and under the Cloverdale name in Canada. The company bought five Kelly-Moore Paints branded stores in July 2014, to increase the number of stores to 53.

References

External links
Corporate website

Paint and coatings companies of the United States
Chemical companies established in 1932
Companies based in Portland, Oregon
Privately held companies based in Oregon
1932 establishments in Oregon